Yashkin or Jaškin is a Slavic masculine surname of Jewish origin, its feminine counterpart is Yashkina or Jaškina. It may refer to
Alexej Jaskin (born 1965), is a Russian-born Czech ice hockey defenceman
Artem Yashkin (born 1975), Ukrainian football player
Dmitri Jaškin (born 1993), Russian-born Czech ice hockey player 

Russian-language surnames